Rajahmundry, officially known as Rajamahendravaram, is a city in the Indian state of Andhra Pradesh and District headquarters of East Godavari district. It is the fifth most populated city in the state. During British rule, the District of Rajahmundry was created in the Madras Presidency in 1823. It was reorganised in 1859 and bifurcated into the Godavari and Krishna districts. Rajahmundry was the headquarters of Godavari district, which was further bifurcated into East Godavari and West Godavari districts in 1925. When the Godavari district  was bifurcated, Kakinada became the headquarters of East Godavari and Eluru became the headquarters of West Godavari. It is administered under Rajahmundry revenue division of the East Godavari district. The city is known for its floriculture, history, culture, agriculture, economy, tourism, and its heritage. It is known as the "Cultural Capital of Andhra Pradesh".

The city's name was derived from Rajaraja Narendra, the ruler of Chalukya dynasty of 11th century who ruled over the city. In 2015, the city was renamed to Rajamahendravaram from the earlier name of Rajahmundry.

Etymology 

The city earlier was called Rajamahendravaram, derived from the Sanskrit name Rajamahendrapuram (The city of King Mahendra). Carrying the same meaning, it is also referred to as Rajamahendri. During Qutb Shahi, Mughal, and Nizam rule, it was referred in official records with name Rājmandrī and same the name was anglicized during the British colonial era as Rajahmundry. On 10 October 2015, the State Government of Andhra Pradesh officially renamed the city with its original name.

History 

Rajahmundry was established by Ammaraja Vishnuvardhana the First (919–934 AD). The city as a prominent settlement can be traced back to the rule of the Eastern Chalukya king Rajaraja Narendra, who reigned around 1022 AD. Remains of 11th-century palaces and forts still exist.

Rulers:
 Eastern Chalukyas
 Cholas
 Kakatiyas
 Eastern Ganga Dynasty
 Reddies 
 Gajapati Empire
 Vijayanagar Rulers
 Bahmani Sultanate
 Golconda Sultanate
 Nizam Rule
 European Rulers and Zamindars

Rajahmundry was under Dutch rule for some time. In 1602, the Dutch constructed a fort here. In 1857, the British conquered the Dutch. They converted it into a jail in 1864 and elevated it into a central jail in 1870. The jail is spread over 196 acres (79 ha) out of which the buildings occupy 37.24 acres (15.07 ha).

In the Madras Presidency, the District of Rajahmundry was created in 1823. It was reorganised in 1859 and was bifurcated into Godavari and Krishna districts. During British rule, Rajahmundry was the headquarters of Godavari district, which was further bifurcated into East Godavari and West Godavari districts in 1925. When the Godavari district was split, Kakinada became the headquarters of East Godavari and Eluru became headquarters of West Godavari.

Rajahmundry was the hotbed of several movements during India's freedom struggle and acted as a base for many key leaders. When the Indian National Congress had its first meeting in Bombay (Mumbai), two leaders from Rajahmundry, Nyapathi Subba Rao and Kandukuri Veeresalingam, participated in it. Subba Rao, founder of Hindu Samaj in Rajahmundry, was also one of the six founders of India's noted English daily, The Hindu.

The Renaissance of Andhra Pradesh started in Rajahmundry. Kandukuri Veeresalingam is known as the Father of reforms in Andhra Pradesh. He started a monthly magazine Vivekavardhini, and a school for girls at Dowleswaram in 1874. The first widow remarriage took place on 11 December 1881. A society with 16 members was started on 22 June 1884, which used to look after widow remarriages in Rajahmundry. The town hall was established in 1890 by Veeresalingam. Bipin Chandra Pal visited Rajahmundry in April 1905 during the Vandemataram Movement. During his visits, he used to address the public in "Pal Chowk" (the present-day Kotipalli Bus Stand). Annie Besant visited Rajahmundry twice. First, she came during the foundations of a branch of the Divya Gyan Samaj at Alcot Gardens were being laid. She came again during the opening ceremony. Ramakrishna Mission was established in the city during 1950–51 near Kambal tank. The place is now the Ayakar Bhavan.

Rajahmundry is acclaimed as the birthplace of the Telugu language—its grammar and script evolved from the pen of the city-born poet Nannayya. Also known as 'Ādi Kavi' (the first poet) of Telugu, Nannayya, along with Tikkana and Yerrana, translated the Sanskrit version of Mahabharata into Telugu. Kandukuri Veeresalingam – a social reformer and the author of Rajashekhara Charithra, the first Telugu novel – was also from Rajahmundry.

Geography 

It is geographically located at centre of Godavari Districts.There is paddy, sugarcane and various varieties of flowers cultivation in the area. River Godavari flows through the west of Rajahmundry.

The Rajahmundry traps, part of the Deccan Traps, are located on the Godavari river and are of particular interest to geologists.

Climate 
The weather is hot and humid, with a tropical climate and, therefore, no distinct seasons. There is heavy monsoon rain at the end of summer, with depressions in the Bay of Bengal.

Demographics 

 Census of India, the city had a population 341,831. 29,883 children are in the age group of 0–6 years, of which 15,152 are boys and 14,731 are girls—a sex ratio of 972 per 1000. The average literacy rate stands at 84.28% (male 88.14%; female 80.54%) with 264,653 literates, significantly higher than the national average of 73.00%.

94.12% of the population spoke Telugu and 3.49% Urdu as their first language.

Governance 

The Government has merged 23 surrounding villages from Korukonda, Rajanagaram, Rajahmundry Rural and Kadiam mandals into Rajamahendravaram Municipal Corporation and upgraded to Greater Rajamahendravaram Municipal Corporation (GRMC). AP govt issued GO no:85 on 28 Jan 2020 and published it in the Gazette on 31.01.2020. Godavari Urban Development Authority (GUDA) is also working for the progress of new master plan.

Present representatives of City:

Margani Bharat Ram (Rajahmundry Lok Sabha).
 Jakkampudi raja (Rajanagaram).
 Gorantla Butchaih Chowdary (Rajahmundry Rural).
 Adireddy Bhavani (Rajahmundry Urban).

Mandals in city:

Seethanagaram
Korukonda
 Rajanagaram
 Rajahmundry Urban
 Rajahmundry Rural
 Kadiam

Floriculture 

Rajahmundry is also famous for flowers. Various varieties of flowers are cultivated here. Nurseries here are spread more than 3,500 acres in Kadiam, Rajahmundry Rural mandals of the city. Floriculture is expanding to Mandapeta town. Central Floriculture Institute and Research Centre is under construction at Vemagiri in the city. Government is exporting these flowers from Rajahmundry Airport through cargo planes.

Economy 

Rajahmundry is a commercial hub for East Godavari and West Godavari Districts. Nurseries in Kadiam mandal generates huge revenue to Rajahmundry revenue division. A floriculture research centre is in construction at Vemagiri to give a major boost to the nurseries in Godavari districts. Floriculture is expanding to Mandapeta, Alamuru and Atreyapuram mandals. Main Road and Tadithota are main marketing places in the city. Many shopping complexes, multiplexes, hotels and convention halls are in construction near NH 216A (old NH 16) and it is becoming another shopping centre. Tourism also generates revenue to this region. It is one of the largest bullion markets in India which consists hundreds of gold, silver and platinum shops throughout the city.

Industries and employment

Rajahmundry is an industrial hub with huge industries generating employment. The city is the headquarters for ONGC, GAIL in K.G. Basin. Godavari districts are one of the largest petrochemical hubs in India. There are two huge paper mills in the city located at Luthergiri and Kadiam. There are two power plants in city i.e., GMR Power Plant and Vijjeswaram Hydel Power Plant. The Government has set up industrial parks and industrial clusters at Nidigatla, Pallakadiam, Rajanagaram, Kadiyam, Jegurapadu areas in the city. The present five-year plan of district consists of making the city as an IT Hub.

Culture

Art and crafts 
Damerla Rama Rao Art Gallery is dedicated to the works of the artist Damerla Rama Rao of the city and showcases various paintings by him such as Krishna Leela, Godavari of Eastern Ghats and Milkmaids of Kathiawar.

Ratnam pens are the first handcrafted pens in India since 1932. The pens are made from ebonite with gold or silver plated nibs. Ratnamson is a brand name of the K.V.Ratnam and sons, Ratnam Ball pen works at Fort Gate, Rajahmudry.

Literature 
Nannayya is the earliest known Telugu poet, and the author of the first third of the Andhra Mahabharatam, a Telugu retelling of the Mahabharata. Sri Kandukuri Veeresalingam (1848–1919), a renowned social reformer, is widely considered as the man who first brought about a renaissance in Telugu literature and Telugu people; he is also known to have fought for women's issues. General Sir Arthur Thomas Cotton, (15 May 1803 – 24 July 1899) was a British General and an Irrigation engineer. Adurthi Subba Rao, prominent old-time Director and Producer of Telugu Films. Julia Maitland, a campaigner for "native" education, founded a multilingual school and reading room in the town in 1837.

Music and films 
Durga Cinetone was the first South Indian film studio, to be built in Rajahmundry in the year 1936 by Nidamarthi Surayya. Many other films are being shot in the city.

The city has produced many well-known artists in the Telugu film industry such as Adurthi Subba Rao, S. V. Ranga Rao, Ali, Raja Babu, Jaya Prada, Sameera Reddy, Bhanupriya, Sriman, Meghna Reddy, Thotakura Venkata Raju, Uma Pemmaraju, Ramesh, Sira Sri, Bhaskarabhatla Ravi Kumar, Ali and J. D. Chakravarthy.

Tourism 

The river Godavari and its bridges and the Sir Arthur Cotton Museum are some of the attractions in the city. Rajahmundry is a tourist destination in the state. Daily tourist boats are availed from Pushkar Ghat to Papikondalu and Bhadrachalam. Nurseries in Kadiam mandal is another tourist destination.

Government of Andhra Pradesh is rehabilitating the old Godavari bridge (Havelock Bridge) and constructing resorts, convention centers, film studios, hotels, recreational places at Pichukalanka and other islands on River Godavari and eco-tourism centre at Kadiyapulanka, Zoological Park. Government of Andhra Pradesh is constructing Rajahmundry International Cricket Stadium on PPP mode to host international matches. Greater Rajamahendravaram Municipal Corporation (GRMC), Godavari Urban Development Authority (GUDA) and Andhra Pradesh Tourism Development Corporation (APTDC) is planning River Front Development on  stretch of river Godavari from Venkatanagaram to Vemagiri. The Government is signing MoUs with private agencies for Malls, Multiplexes, Hotels, Convention Centers and Recreational places on PPP mode as a part of tourism development. Rajahmundry Airport is being developed as an international airport for giving a major boost to tourism in Godavari districts.

Transport 

The bridges across Godavari river are an important transport infrastructure for connectivity such as, the Godavari Bridge, which is the third longest railroad bridge in India; and the Godavari Arch Bridge, commissioned on 14 March 1997 for Howrah–Chennai main line. While, the Old Godavari Bridge (The Havelock Bridge) was the earliest of all, built in 1897 and was decommissioned in 1997. The city also has Dowleswaram Cotton Barrage bridge and fourth bridge on either side of the main city that connects the highways of East Godavari and West Godavari districts.

Roads 
Rajahmundry is very well connected to the state and the rest of India with a network of state and national highways. NH 16 passes through the city. NH 365BB, NH 516D connects the city with Khammam, Suryapet and Hyderabad. NH 216A which is a spur road to NH-16 connects the city with Ravulapalem, Tanuku, Tadepalligudem and Eluru. NH 516E connects the city with Vizianagaram via Rampachodavaram, Narsipatnam and Araku.

ADB Road and SH 40 (Canal Road) connects the city with Kakinada and SH 41 is connected with Odisha, Chhattisgarh, Telangana borders with Andhra Pradesh and Bhadrachalam. SH 104 connects the city with Amalapuram. SH 172 is connected to Purushottampatnam and Polavaram Project. SH 72 connects the city to Nidadavolu, Palakollu and Narasapuram, Bhimavaram.

NHAI is constructing flyovers on NH 16 and NH 216A at Diwancheruvu, Lalacheruvu, Morampudi, Vemagiri and Kadiyapulanka junctions in the city to ease traffic. Trumpet Bridge is being constructed at ADB road on NH 16 in Rajanagaram. An ROB was proposed from Morampudi to Kotipalli Bus stand. Godavari Urban Development Authority (GUDA), Greater Rajamahendravaram Municipal Corporation (GRMC) are constructing an outer ring road (ORR) for the city to ease traffic in the city.

Railways 

Rajahmundry railway station is classified as an A category station. It is located on the Howrah-Chennai main line of South Central Railway zone. The new platforms 4 and 5 will be operational in the year 2023. A second railway line is proposed on the Godavari Arch Bridge. A new railway line to Raipur from the city connecting Rampachodavaram and other East agency areas is in the proposal. The frequency of trains will be increased after the completion of Kovvur-Bhadrachalam railway line and the distance to  will be decreased.

Waterways 

National Waterway 4 was declared on 24 November 2008, which connects the Indian states of Telangana, Andhra Pradesh, Tamil Nadu, and the union territory of Puducherry. It passes through Kakinada, Rajahmundry, Tadepalligudem, Eluru, Commanur, Buckingham Canal and also part of Krishna and Godavari rivers. Kakinada Port is the nearest port to the city. A new commercial port is under construction at Kakinada City by GMR on PPP mode. Narasapuram Port is proposed according to AP State Reorganisation Act. It is being developed by Inland Waterways Authority of India.Inland water port is proposed at Bobbillanka. APTDC and other private agencies' boats and launches are available daily from Pushakar Ghat to Papikondalu and Bhadrachalam.

Airways 

Rajahmundry Airport is situated at Madhurapudi in the north of Rajamahendravaram. The airport serves the people of godavari districts in Andhra Pradesh. Indigo airline has been operating non-stop flights to and fro the cities namely Bangalore, Chennai, Hyderabad, Tirupati, and Visakhapatnam. The direct flight services to Mumbai and Delhi are expected in the near future. The airport's runway was expanded from 1,749 m to 3,165 m and it is the second longest runway in the state of Andhra Pradesh. A new integrated domestic terminal will come up at Rajahmundry airport as part of its expansion and upgradation plans. The new terminal building, which will be built at a cost of Rs 135 crore, will have all modern facilities including aero bridges, and will be able to handle 1,400 passengers (700 arrivals and 700 departures) at a time. The airport has also obtained a DGCA license for handling wide-bodied aircraft such as Airbus A321 and Boeing 737. The airport has a dedicated cargo terminal. The government of AP is keen on exporting flowers through this airport from the nurseries in Kadiyam mandal of East Godavari district.

Education 
The primary and secondary school education is imparted by government, aided and private schools, under the School Education Department of the state. As per the school information report for the academic year 2016–17, the city has 55,501 students enrolled in 244 schools. The medium of instruction followed by schools are Telugu and English. The Railway High School in the city has a history of more than hundred years, established in the year 1909.

The city has one of the thirteen regional offices of the Board of Intermediate Education, which administers Intermediate education (10+2) education. The Government Junior College is the only government run junior college, established in 1974 and there are four private-aided, twenty private-unaided colleges in the city.

The Government Arts College was founded more than 150 years ago by the reformer, Kandukuri Veeresalingam Panthulu. The BEd Training Institute is one of the oldest in India. Adikavi Nannaya University was established in March 2006, named after an 11th-century poet, Nannayya. Other major universities in the city include Potti Sreeramulu Telugu University, Acharya N. G. Ranga Agricultural University, Dr. B.R. Ambedkar Open University Study Center. Andhra Pradesh State Forest Academy is located in the city for Forest skills training.

Central Government Institutions in the city are as follows:

"Central Tobacco Research Institute (CTRI)".
"National Centre for Disease Control (NCDC)".
"National Academy of Constructions (NAC)".

"Central Floriculture Institute and Research Centre" is in construction at Vemagiri. "Science City" is in construction at Bommuru.

After the Reorganization of Andhra Pradesh State the following institutes are sanctioned for the city:

"Indian Institute of Petroleum and Energy (IIPE)". 
"National Civil Aviation Academy".
"National Institute of Drama (NID)".
"AP State Forest Academy".

See also 
List of cities in Andhra Pradesh
List of municipal corporations in India
Rajamundry Sarkar

References

External links 

 

 

Cities in Andhra Pradesh
Mandal headquarters in East Godavari district
Archaeological sites in Andhra Pradesh
Ancient Indian cities
Hindu holy cities
Former capital cities in India
Cities and towns in East Godavari district